Arizona (stylized as A R I Z O N A) is an American pop rock and electropop band from New Jersey (despite its name) currently signed to Atlantic Records. The band's debut studio album GALLERY was released on May 19, 2017, peaking at No. 4 on Top Heatseekers, No. 24 on U.S. Alternative, and No. 143 on the Billboard 200.

History 
 
Band members Zachary Charles, Nathan Esquite, and David Labuguen began creating together as a group of friends in Boston while attending Berklee College of Music and Emerson College. During college, the three of them began working as songwriters and producers, before moving to Los Angeles, England, and finally back to their home state of New Jersey. 
 
Arizona was signed to Atlantic Records in 2016. The band released several singles that year, including "I Was Wrong", "Oceans Away", and "Cross My Mind". Robin Schulz produced the official remix of "I Was Wrong", and, by August 2016, the original song had accrued 16 million streams online. The Robin Schulz remix also appeared on Billboards Hot Dance/Electronic Songs chart for 9 weeks.
 
In 2017, the band toured with and opened for Kevin Garrett and, later, Coin. In March of that year, their single, "Oceans Away" had garnered 35.8 million streams on Spotify. On May 19, 2017, the band released its debut studio album, Gallery, on Atlantic Records. The album peaked at No. 143 on the Billboard 200 chart. Arizona has also played several festivals including South by Southwest, the Governors Ball Music Festival, Firefly Music Festival, and Lollapalooza. The band went on a North American headlining tour in the Fall of 2017. Also in 2017, Don Diablo (a Dutch DJ who is No. 11 in the world according to DJ Mag) produced the song, "Take Her Place" with Arizona. The song appeared on Diablo's album, Future.

In July 2018, the band released two new songs, "Summer Days" and "Freaking Out". They also started an arena tour that month, opening for Panic! at the Disco.

The band's sophomore album "Asylum" was released on October 11, 2019 and peaked at No.17 on Billboards Heatseekers Album Chart

Discography

Studio albums

Live albums

Singles

Other releases 
2016: "People Crying Every Night"
2016: "Let Me Touch Your Fire"
2016: "Cross My Mind"
2016: "Oceans Away"
2017: "Cross My Mind Pt. 2" (featuring Kiiara)
2017: "Passionfruit"  [Recorded at Spotify Studios NYC] 
2018: "What She Wants"
2018: "Summer Days"
2018: "Take Her Place" (Don Diablo featuring Arizona)
2019: "Find Someone"
2019: "Hold The Line" (Avicii featuring Arizona) 
2020: "Feel Alive (R3HAB featuring Arizona) [From SCOOB! The Album]
2021: "So What" (With Louis the Child (DJs))
2022: "Heart So Big" (With Matoma)
2023: "Moving On"

References

External links 
Official website
 

Electronic music groups from New Jersey
Atlantic Records artists
Rock music groups from New Jersey